Lipowa  is a village in Żywiec County, Silesian Voivodeship, in southern Poland. It is the seat of the gmina (administrative district) called Gmina Lipowa. The village has a population of 4,322.

It is one of the oldest villages in Żywiec Basin. It was established in the late 13th century, and soon it became a seat of a Catholic parish.

References

Villages in Żywiec County